David Williams Bentley  (1882–1970) was the 7th Bishop of Barbados.

Born in Liverpool, he was ordained in 1906 and served as a curate in Barrow-in-Furness from 1906–1910. Educated at Durham University, he served as President of St Cuthbert's Society in 1910, establishing a reputation as a scholar, a dedicated  oarsman and a committed and proselytising socialist having acquired his socialism when serving as curate in the slums of Barrow. A curacy in Bethnal Green (1910–1914) was followed by two years as Vicar of St Matthias Plaistow.

In 1917 he emigrated to the Caribbean to take up the post of Warden of St Peter's College, Jamaica. He was consecrated bishop in 1919, after which he served as Suffragan Bishop of Jamaica until he was appointed Bishop of Barbados in 1927. A particular feature of his episcopacy was the promotion of education, and in 1938 he was appointed a CBE for his services to education in Barbados.

"A forceful and lovely preacher, Dr Bentley always received a warm welcome at all the Parishes which he visited ..."

Bentley retired in 1945 but continued to live in Barbados until his death in 1970.

References

1882 births
Alumni of the University of London
Alumni of St Cuthbert's Society, Durham
Anglican bishops of Barbados
1970 deaths
20th-century English Anglican priests
British emigrants to Barbados
Barbadian academic administrators
Anglican socialists
English Christian socialists